The following is a list of airports and air base in Kenya, sorted by location.



List

See also 
 Transport in Kenya
 List of airports by ICAO code: H#HK - Kenya
 Wikipedia: WikiProject Aviation/Airline destination lists: Africa#Kenya

References

External links 
 Lists of airports in Kenya:
 Great Circle Mapper
 Aircraft Charter World
 World Aero Data

Kenya transport-related lists
Kenya
Lists of buildings and structures in Kenya
Kenya